Alice is a song by Tom Waits appearing on his 2002 album Alice.

Accolades 

(*) designates unordered lists.

Personnel
Adapted from the Alice liner notes.

 Tom Waits – vocals, piano, production
Musicians
 Ara Anderson – muted trumpet
 Eric Perney – bass guitar
 Gino Robair – drums
 Colin Stetson – saxophone

Production and additional personnel
 Kathleen Brennan – production
 Oz Fritz – recording, mixing
 Doug Sax – mastering
 Jeff Sloan – engineering

Release history

References 

2002 songs
2002 singles
Tom Waits songs
Songs written by Tom Waits
Songs written by Kathleen Brennan